Pehchaan: The Face of Truth is a Bollywood film released in 2005. The film directed by Shrabani Deodhar stars Vinod Khanna, Rati Agnihotri and Raveena Tandon who also produced the film.

Synopsis 
Mridula is a headstrong, opinionated girl who along with her best friend Swati, go to college together. The two are really close and do everything together. They successfully finish their education, and go on to marry into respective families. Mridula marries Milind D. Khanna, the son of top lawyer Deepak Khanna (Vinod Khanna) and Swati marries Ajay Lal, the son of a high ranked politician.

Many years pass, and Mridula now a lawyer hears from a friend that Swati has committed suicide. Her friend tells her the circumstances surrounding her death and Mridula suspects that Swati's death was far from suicide. Mridula gets hold of Swati's diary in which she chronicled her daily thoughts. After reading the diary, Mridula is convinced that Swati was murdered by her in-laws and husband.

Determined to get justice for her deceased friend, Mridula decides to fight the case against the Lal family. Unfortunately, her father-in-law is fighting the case for the Lal's. Milind tries to convince Mridula to drop the case but she refuses, causing a rift between husband and wife. During the rift she finds support with her mother-in-law, Uttara Khanna (Rati Agnihotri) who urges her to fight for justice.

Mridula is caught between being a dutiful wife and a loyal friend. As she fights the case, her family and more importantly her unborn child are placed in danger by supporters of the Lal family...

Cast 
 Vinod Khanna as Advocate Deepak Khanna
 Rati Agnihotri as Uttara D. Khanna
 Raveena Tandon as Mridula Khanna
 Sudhanshu Pandey as Milind Khanna, Mridula's husband
 Rajinder Sharma as Dr. Sinha
 Juhi Parmar as Swati Lal
 Vineet Kumar as Hasmukh Lal
 Prabhat Bhattacharya as Ajay Lal
 Diwakar Pundir as Prasad Saxena

Music
Dil De Dil Tu De De - Sunidhi Chauhan
Pal Hai Khushi - Kumar Sanu & Mahalakshmi Iyer
Sun Le Sun Le - N/A
Thode Se Paagal - N/A

References

External links
 

Films scored by Daboo Malik
2005 films
2000s Hindi-language films
Films directed by Shrabani Deodhar